The 1975–76 Indiana Hoosiers men's basketball team represented Indiana University Bloomington and were the winners of the NCAA Men's Division I Tournament, the school's third national championship. The Hoosiers included three All-Americans and were led by head coach Bob Knight, in his fifth year, to an undefeated 32–0 record. The team played its home games in Assembly Hall in Bloomington, Indiana, and was a member of the Big Ten Conference. They remain, as of the 2022–23 season, the last team to be undefeated National Champions.

Roster

Regular season
After coming up just short of winning a national championship the season before (1974–75), when they lost to Kentucky in the tournament, the 1975–76 team got off to a hot start. Starters Scott May, Quinn Buckner, Bobby Wilkerson and Kent Benson returned. Head coach Bobby Knight, then in his fifth year at Indiana, moved senior Tom Abernethy into Steve Green's starting role. Guard Bobby Wilkerson was an unsung hero who could do a little bit of everything. The team entered the season ranked No. 1.

In a preseason exhibition game against the reigning World Champion, the Soviet National team, the Hoosiers won by a convincing 94–78 margin. The Soviet team included two stars from their gold medal team in 1972, Aleksandr Belov and Sergei Belov. The game was played before a sellout crowd of 17,377 at the new (now-defunct) Market Square Arena in Indianapolis. Star Scott May scored 34 points on 13-for-15 shooting.

The Hoosiers then opened the season with an 84–64 win over the reigning NCAA National Champion, UCLA, which was coached by John Wooden's successor Gene Bartow. The game was played in St. Louis as one of the first made-for-TV games in college history, with the starting time at 11 p.m. for maximum national airing. May scored 33 points.

The Hoosiers returned to Market Square Arena to play Florida State. The Seminoles' head coach, Hugh Durham, said before the game: "They beat Russia to prove they're the best in the world. And they beat UCLA to prove they're the best in the United States. Now I'd like to see them prove they're human and have a bad game." At halftime Indiana led 47–20 and they would go on to win 83–59. May scored 24 points and Kent Benson added 22. Afterward Durham said, "I'm glad this isn't like baseball. I'd hate to play these guys in a three-game homestand."

The Hoosiers ended the regular season unbeaten, a feat that would be accomplished only seven times since, by Larry Bird-led 1979 Indiana State Sycamores, the 1979 Alcorn State Braves, the 1991 UNLV Runnin' Rebels, the 2004 St. Joseph's Hawks, the 2014 Wichita State Shockers, the 2015 Kentucky Wildcats, and the 2021 Gonzaga Bulldogs. All but Alcorn State and St. Joseph's would enter the NCAA Tournament unbeaten.

Indiana is the last team to go unbeaten through the entire season, through preconference and conference seasons, and also finish unbeaten winning the NCAA Tournament. That mark has stood since 1976, though the number of games required to maintain an unbeaten season has increased in present times, making it more difficult to attain.  The Hoosiers also had the distinction of having all five regular starting players earn their NBA pension.

Schedule/Results

|-
!colspan=8 style=| Regular Season
|-

|-
!colspan=8 style=| NCAA Tournament

NCAA tournament

Entering the NCAA Tournament the No. 1 ranked Hoosiers ended up with a difficult route for a No. 1 ranked team. The route included a regional matchup of No. 1 and No. 2 Marquette and convinced the NCAA Tournament Committee to begin seeding the tournament.

In the first game Indiana beat No. 18 St. John's 90–70. Scott May scored 33 points over a 23–6 team that had been unbeaten before Indiana beat them in December before a college-record Madison Square Garden crowd of 19,964.

In the next game Indiana beat No. 7 Alabama 74–69 behind the play of Scott May (25 points, 16 rebounds). Alabama led 69–68 when May hit a jump shot with 2:02 left. At the time, Coach Knight called this Alabama team the best any of his teams ever played.

Against No. 2 Marquette, the Hoosiers won 65–56. Marquette coach, Al McGuire, attempted to contain May by using a box-and-one defense. May scored 15 points but sat out 13 minutes with foul problems. Marquette was 27–2 on the year and would go on to win the NCAA championship the following season.

In the next game the Hoosiers once again faced the UCLA Bruins, who entered the game ranked No. 5 with a 27–3 record. The Hoosiers won 65–51 behind 19 rebounds from 6′7″ guard Bobby Wilkerson and strong play from Tom Abernethy.

In the championship game, Indiana squared off against No. 9 Michigan for the third match up between the teams that season. After Indiana lost Wilkerson early to a concussion, Michigan led at half-time, 35–29. The Hoosiers ultimately prevailed 86–68. May had 26 points, Buckner 16, and Outstanding Player Award-winner Benson had 25.

Indiana finished the season with a 32–0 record, and since 1976 no men's NCAA Division I team has gone unbeaten the whole season.

Awards and honors
 Kent Benson, NCAA Men's MOP Award
 Bob Knight, Big Ten Coach of the Year
 Scott May, National Player of the Year
  Scott May, Big Ten Player of the Year

Team players drafted into the NBA

References

Indiana
Indiana Hoosiers men's basketball seasons
NCAA Division I men's basketball tournament championship seasons
NCAA Division I men's basketball tournament Final Four seasons
Indiana
Indiana Hoosiers
Indiana Hoosiers